Bezhanovo is a village in Lukovit Municipality, Lovech Province, northern Bulgaria.

References

Villages in Lovech Province